Der letzte Walzer (The Last Waltz) is a Viennese operetta in three acts, with music by Oscar Straus, to a libretto by Julius Brammer and Alfred Grünwald.

English adaptations
An English adaptation for Broadway was prepared by Harold R. Atteridge and Edward Delaney, with additional music by Al Goodman and opened at the Century Theatre in New York on May 10, 1921, running for 185 performances. The show was directed by J. C. Huffman.

Another English adaptation was prepared for the London stage by Robert Evett and Reginald Arkell. This version opened at the Gaiety Theatre, London on December 7, 1922 and ran for 240 performances. It starred Jose Collins, who sang "The Mirror Song" on BBC radio.

Film
The operetta was the basis for a 1927 German silent film The Last Waltz directed by Arthur Robison and starring Liane Haid, Willy Fritsch and Suzy Vernon. It was then filmed again in 1934, 1936, 1953 and in 1973.

Roles
General Krasian
Baron Ippolith Mekowitch
Prince Paul
Lieutenant Jack Merrington
Captain Kaminski
Lieutenant Labinski
Ensign Orsinski
Vladek
Officer of the Guard
Countess Alexandrowna
Annuschka, Hannuschka, Petruschka, Babuschka, and Vera Lisaveta, her daughters
Chorus of Officer, Attendants, Court Ladies, etc.

Musical numbers
Act 1
 Man is Master of His Fate – Merrington
 Love, the Minstrel – Vera
 Mama! Mama! – Countess, Annuschka, Hannuschka, Petruschka
 I Love You Best Of All – Ippolith and Girls
 The Last waltz – Merrington and Vera

Act 2
 The Laggard Lovers – Ippolith, Girls and Officers
 The Mirror Song – Vera
 I Must Not Tell You So – Babuschka and Ippolith
 When Life and Love Are Calling – Vera and Merrington

Act 3
O-la-la! – Vera

References

External links
 Information about the various productions
 
 
 
 
 
 
 Information about BBC broadcast

German-language operettas
Operas by Oscar Straus
1920 operas
Operas